Oleh Oleksandrovich Myronets (born 29 May 1998 in Nedoboivtsi) is a Ukrainian athlete. He represented Ukraine at the 2021 European Athletics Indoor Championships – Men's 800 metres.

References
 https://worldathletics.org/athletes/ukraine/oleh-myronets-14741868

Ukrainian male middle-distance runners
1998 births
Living people
Athletes (track and field) at the 2019 European Games
European Games medalists in athletics
European Games gold medalists for Ukraine
Sportspeople from Chernivtsi Oblast